Leiyang is a county-level city and the third most populous county-level division in Hunan Province, China. Leiyang is under the administration of the prefecture-level city of Hengyang. Located on the south of the province, the city is bordered to the north by Hengnan County, to the west by Changning City, to the south by Guiyang and Yongxing counties, to the east by Anren County. The city has six subdistricts, 19 towns and five townships under its jurisdiction, the government seat is Caizichi Subdistrict.

History
Leiyang is the hometown of Cai Lun, the inventor of Papermaking technology, one of the Four Great Inventions. It has more than 2,000 years of history as an ancient city named after the north of Lei River. Archaeological excavation proved that as early as the Neolithic Age, people have been lived in the territory of Leiyang.

Until Leiyang was built as a division, it was a part of Jingzhou, one of the Nine Provinces before the Spring and Autumn Period and a part of Chu State in the Warring States period. In the 26th year of the Qin Shi Huang (221 BC), Lei County was formed and took its name after the Lei River, it was part of Changsha Commandery. Dividing Changsha Commandery into Changsha State and Guiyang Commandery (not to be confused with present-day Guiyang County) in 202 BC, Guiyang Commandery was formed from the southern portion of Changsha Commandery, the county of Lei was renamed to Leiyang and part of Guiyang Commandery.

In the three kingdoms period (220–280 AD), Leiyang was the territory of the Wu State. In 257 AD, the county of Leiyang was divided into four counties, that the two counties of Xinping and Xinning were located on the western side of Chongling River, and the two counties of Leiyang and Liyang on the eastern side of Chongling River and western bank of Lei River. The three counties of Xinping, Xinning and Liyang were located in Xiangdong Commandery and the county of Leiyang in Guiyang Commandery.

In 395 AD, the county of Liyang was merged to Leiyang. The county of Leiyang was renamed to Leiyin in 589 and restored the name of Leiyang in 621. In the Five Dynasties and Ten Kingdoms period (907–960 AD), Leiyang was the territory of the Machu State. The county of Leiyang was renamed to Laiyang in the Song Dynasty period and restored the name in the Yuan Dynasty period. In November 1986, the county of Leiyang was reorganized as a county-level city.

Geography

Climate

Culture
According to the historical novel Romance of the Three Kingdoms, Pang Tong was chosen as magistrate of Leiyang by Liu Bei. After three years he had failed to fulfill the duties of his office. Many were upset by his failure and appealed to Liu Bei. Liu Bei sent Zhang Fei, his sworn brother, to Leiyang to investigate. Before Zhang Fei arrived, Pang Tong, who knew that Zhang Fei loved wine, ordered that all wine must be diluted with water. Once Zhang Fei arrived, true to his reputation, he consumed copious amounts of wine, but wondered why he never became drunk. He realized what was going on and became very angry with Pang Tong. In order to appease Zhang Fei, Pang Tong agreed to finish the three years worth of backlogged cases within three days, which he did. For this, Pang Tong was promoted by Liu Bei and to honor the occasion, a special wine was created, now known as Zhang Fei Wine.

In 1928, according to the biography of Mao Zedong by Jung Chang and John Halliday, Leiyang, along with neighboring Chenzhou was razed by troops under the command of Zhu De, who was following directives which originated in Moscow and passed on by higher officials of the Chinese Communist Party.  The strategy was to leave large numbers of peasants with no option but to join communist uprisings.

Language
Leiyangers speak a dialect resembling Gan Chinese.

Subdivision

6 subdistricts
 Caizichi
 Sanjia
 Shuidongjiang
 Wulipai
 Yuqing
 Zaoshijie

19 towns
 Daozi
 Dashi
 Dayi
 Donghuxu
 Feitian
 Gongpingxu
 Huangshi
 Longtang
 Mashui
 Nanjing
 Nanyang
 Renyi
 Sandu
 Xiaoshui
 Xiatang
 Xinshi
 Yaotian
 Yongji
 Zheqiao

5 townships 
 Changping
 Dahexu
 Liangyuan
 Taipingxu
 Tanxia

Economy
According to preliminary accounting of the statistical authority, the gross domestic product of Leiyang City in 2017 was 47,315 million yuan (7,001 million US dollars), up by 8.1 percent over the previous year. Of this total, the value added of the primary industry was 7,100 million yuan (1,050 million US dollars), up by 3.7 percent, that of the secondary industry was 16,321 million yuan (2,415 million US dollars), up by 3.2 percent and that of the tertiary industry was 23,894 million yuan (3,535 million US dollars), up by 13.3 percent. The value added of the primary industry accounted for 15.01 percent of the GDP; that of the secondary industry accounted for 34.49 percent; and that of the tertiary industry accounted for 50.50 percent. The per capita GDP in 2017 was 40,708 yuan (6,023 US dollars).

Leiyang is a center of paper production.  Other raw materials produced in the area today include kaolin, white marble, and "heavy calcium carbonate".

Some of the newer large homes in Leiyang were built by drillers working in Shenzhen. By 2019, due to age and health problems such as silicosis, many of these migrant construction workers had returned to Hunan.

Industry
Territory of large reserves of kaolin, is a good paper stock.
Yipo abundant coal resources, reserves of anthracite forecast close to 10 million tons.
Forest fir, pine, South bamboo, tea.

Transportation
Guangzhou Railway, Leiyang Station, located stove Street neighborhood offices
G4 Hong Kong and Macao Expressway, Leiyang territory of New Town, Leiyang, three high-speed intersection fair
107 State Road, north to south
S320 Provincial Highway, east–west, east to Chaling, heading for Qiyang
Away from Narita Airport, a military airport
Leishui shipping
Beijing-Guangzhou high-speed rail (Wuhan-Guangzhou passenger dedicated line), Leiyang West Railway Station, located west direction along the three district offices, 2009 started as a four-wire dual platform.

Leisure and entertainment
Martyrs Cemetery, Leiyang recreation center is formed spontaneously. 
Wuyi Square, 90s entertainment places fewer people are in the fitness and entertainment. Especially at night from seven to nine o'clock this time, so many people; build inventor and Dragon Square Plaza, the public will choose the nearest location.
Fifty-one cinema, located in the center of Wuyi Road, Leiyang been the most prosperous of the lot.
Du Park, located on Lei water Dongzhou, Du Fu in this drunken soldier body, buried in this (later moved to Leiyang one).
Square, inventor and Dragon Square, the largest square in Leiyang. Here young people skating, skateboarding; old people doing aerobics, talk.
Cai Lun Park, site of the original stage, is one of the public places of leisure and entertainment.
Yanhe, countless snacks, snack stalls, karaoke.
In recent years, cultural and entertainment Leiyang annual production value of nearly 50 million yuan, profits of more than 34 million yuan, paid taxes more than 1,600 yuan.

References

External links
Official website of Leiyang Government

 
Cities in Hunan
Hengyang